The 1970 Lehigh Engineers football team was an American football team that represented Lehigh University as an independent during the 1970 NCAA College Division football season.

In their sixth year under head coach Fred Dunlap, the Engineers compiled a 4–6 record. Thad Jamula and Geo Nicholson were the team captains.

Following the decision by the Middle Atlantic Conference to end football competition in its University Division, the Engineers competed as a football independent in 1970, though five of the former league rivals (Bucknell, Delaware, Gettysburg, Lafayette and Lehigh) continued to play an informal round-robin called the "Middle Five". 

The three-way rivalry with Lafayette and Rutgers remained on Lehigh's football schedule, but press reports in 1970 make no mention of a Middle Three Conference champion.

Lehigh played its home games at Taylor Stadium on the university campus in Bethlehem, Pennsylvania.

Schedule

References

Lehigh
Lehigh Mountain Hawks football seasons
Lehigh Engineers football